Reggie Gibson (born August 23, 1970), better known as Saafir, is an emcee, producer, and actor. He is also a member of the rap group "Golden State Project" (formerly known as Golden State Warriors) with Ras Kass and Xzibit. Born in Oakland, California, he lived with Tupac Shakur and became a dancer for Digital Underground.  Saafir took part in one of the most notorious Bay Area rap battles, when he and members of the Hobo Junction went against Casual and members of the Hieroglyphics Crew. The battle took place live on KMEL.

Saafir made his recording debut on several cuts on Digital Underground's The Body-Hat Syndrome in 1993, followed by an appearance on Casual's Fear Itself in early 1994. He appeared in the film Menace II Society as Harold Lawson and was featured on the film's soundtrack. With a deal from Qwest Records, Saafir recruited the Hobo Junction production team (J Groove, J.Z., Rational, Big Nose, and Poke Martian) for his freestyle debut, Boxcar Sessions (1994). He recorded an album called Trigonometry under the alias Mr. No No before returning as Saafir in The Hit List (1999).  The Hit List was considered Saafir's attempt at commercial acceptance. The album featured production by Stevie J (made famous for his work with P. Diddy's Hitmen production team) and guest vocals from West Coast heavyweights Kam and Jayo Felony and controversial East Coast lyricist Chino XL.  In 2006, he released his fourth album, Good Game: The Transition (ABB Records, 2006). The album covers the major transitions throughout his life, most notably his spinal tumor, and his conversion to Islam.

In February 2013 on Davey D's Hip-Hop Corner, Digital Underground leader Shock-G revealed that Saafir had begun using a wheelchair due to complications from his spinal surgery.  Saafir later appeared on Sway & King Tech's The Wake Up Show to confirm his condition and clear up some of the misconceptions stemming from Shock-G's announcement.

Saafir was one of the passengers flying on TWA Flight 843; he suffered a back injury as a consequence of evacuating an aborted takeoff and consequent hard landing, crash and fire on July 30, 1992.

Starting in 2012 Saafir's son, Saafir Gibson began to release music under the moniker Saafir.

Discography
1994: Boxcar Sessions
1998: Trigonometry
1999: The Hit List
2006: Good Game: The Transition
2009: Fast Lane (EP)

References

External links
 
 Interview by Mark Pollard (October 1998)
 Saafir @ TheRapCella.com
 Movie Cant Stop Wont Stop with Saafir
 Interview with Garrett Caples (March 2013)

African-American male rappers
Qwest Records artists
1970 births
Living people
21st-century American rappers
21st-century American male musicians
21st-century African-American musicians